Ubuntu is a 2017 Marathi language drama film which is produced and directed by Pushkar Shrotri

Cast

 Shashank Shende as Sarpanch
 Sarang Sathaye as Mastar
 Umesh Jagtap as Razzak
 Bhagyashree Shankpal as Gauri
 Kanha Bhave as Sanket
 Atharva Padhye as Abdul
 Arati More as Salma
 Shubham Pawar as Vikas
 Arya Hadkar as Chandu
 Purvesh Kotian as Madhav
 Chaitrali Gadkari as Ankita
 Arya Saudagar as Manju
 Balkrushna Raul as Balkrushna
 Yogini Pophale as Gauri's Mother
 Smruti Patkar as Sarpanch's Wife
 Kalpana Jagtap as Abdul's Mother
 Satish Joshi as Villager

Release
Ubuntu released on 15 September 2017 with English subtitles in Maharashtra, Gujarat, Goa, Madhya Pradesh, Delhi, Karnataka, Andhra Pradesh and Telangana.

Box office
The film started with a low occupancy but the evening shows picked up and went higher in terms of occupancy and collection. As per reports, the 1st day box office collection for Ubuntu tolled to around 1.2 crores on the box office.

Soundtrack

Music
The songs for the film are composed by Kaushal Inamdar.

References

External links 

2017 films
Indian drama films
2010s Marathi-language films
2017 drama films